Rick Rivera may refer to:

Rick Rivera, character in Maging Akin Ka Lamang
Rick Rivera, character on List of Marcus Welby, M.D. episodes